Jacques Lüthy (born 11 July 1959) is a Swiss former alpine skier who competed in the 1980 Winter Olympics.Lüthy was born in Charmey. In 1980, he won the bronze medal in the slalom event. In the giant slalom competition he finished fifth.

References

1959 births
Living people
Swiss male alpine skiers
Olympic alpine skiers of Switzerland
Alpine skiers at the 1980 Winter Olympics
Olympic bronze medalists for Switzerland
Olympic medalists in alpine skiing

Medalists at the 1980 Winter Olympics
20th-century Swiss people